Mark Werner Snijders (born 12 March 1972) is a Dutch former footballer. He spent eight years with AZ Alkmaar and then three years playing in the Football League with Port Vale.

Career
Snijders left his home town club AZ Alkmaar for English First Division club Port Vale following a successful trial in the summer of 1997, leaving behind a newly signed contract with AZ. He was one of a number of John Rudge's Dutch signings. He made his Vale debut in a 2–1 win over Stockport County at Vale Park on 9 September 1997. He scored his first goal for the club eighteen days later, in a 2–0 home win over Queens Park Rangers. In all he made 25 appearances that season, picking up his second goal in a 3–2 win over Manchester City at Maine Road. His classy play and skilful reading of the game impressed the Vale faithful.

In 1998–99 the club were battling against relegation, Snijders played five games in August, but fell out of the first team and only made a total of twelve appearances. He had suffered with injuries and a loss of form. The 1999–2000 season saw Vale suffer relegation and the departure of Rudge. Snijders was a semi-regular under both Rudge and his replacement Brian Horton, playing 22 games that season. He was sent off at the Alexandra Stadium, in a 2–1 defeat to near rivals Crewe Alexandra on 7 March. He was released by the club at the end of the season and joined his old amateur side AFC '34, back in the Netherlands.

Career statistics
Source:

References

1972 births
Living people
Sportspeople from Alkmaar
Footballers from North Holland
Dutch footballers
Association football defenders
AFC '34 players
AZ Alkmaar players
Dutch expatriate footballers
Expatriate footballers in England
Port Vale F.C. players
Eerste Divisie players
Eredivisie players
English Football League players